Hiram Congdon House is a historic home located at Putnam in Washington County, New York.  It was built about 1848 and is a -story, five-by-two-bay, side-gabled frame building with a 1-story ell.  The main block is a  heavy timber-frame structure set on a rubble stone foundation.

It was listed on the National Register of Historic Places in 1997.

References

Houses completed in 1848
Houses on the National Register of Historic Places in New York (state)
Georgian architecture in New York (state)
Houses in Washington County, New York
National Register of Historic Places in Washington County, New York